Freda Briggs  (1 December 1930 – 6 April 2016) was an Australian academic, author and child protection advocate. In 2000, she was named Senior Australian of the Year for her pioneering work in child protection.

Early life and education
Briggs was born Freda Akeroyd on 1 December 1930 in Huddersfield, England. She had one brother, nine years her junior. She attended Deighton Council School and Royds Hall School.

Briggs worked briefly as an office clerk at Imperial Chemical Industries before joining the London Metropolitan Police, working in child protection. She said in 2007 that she joined the police after seeing an advertisement in a local paper seeking female police recruits, noting that it offered free accommodation and food.

In 1963, Briggs started studying by correspondence, eventually completing a teacher training course at Warwick University. She worked as a teacher and social worker in Derbyshire for six years. She completed a graduate degree in education and obtained postgraduate qualifications in psychology and sociology at the University of Sheffield and became a lecturer in child development.

Career
Briggs emigrated to Melbourne in 1975 to become Director of Early Childhood Studies at the State College of Victoria (now part of Monash University). She moved to Adelaide in 1980, where she became dean of the Institute of Early Childhood and Family Studies at the University of South Australia and established a pioneering child protection course. In 2004, the Prime Minister of Australia, John Howard, recognised her work by awarding a $10 million endowment for the provision of the National Child Protection Research Centre at the university. In 2005, she was appointed Foundation Chair of Child Development and an emeritus professor, lecturing in sociology, child protection and family studies.

Briggs provided assistance to royal commissions and parliamentary inquiries and wrote numerous submissions to state and federal inquiries relating to child protection, including the Mullighan Inquiry in South Australia (2004–2008) and the Royal Commission into Institutional Responses to Child Sexual Abuse. She advised police forces in Australia and New Zealand and was a media consultant on child protection issues relating to TV, movies and computer games. Briggs was considered one of Australia's leading experts about child abuse issues and an outspoken advocate for children's rights internationally.

Briggs was a patron for the Adelaide Women's and Children's Hospital paediatric palliative care project and a South Australia ambassador to the prime minister's department on the recognition of women. She also campaigned with success against mandatory retirement from the workforce at 65.

Personal life
Briggs married Kenneth Briggs in 1952. They became foster carers early in their marriage and had two children of their own.

Death
Briggs died at the Royal Adelaide Hospital on 6 April 2016 at age 85.

Awards and honours
Briggs was the inaugural recipient of the Australian Humanitarian Award in 1998. She was named Senior Australian of the Year in 2000 and became an officer of the Order of Australia in 2005. She was also a recipient of the Anzac Fellowship Award, the national Centenary Medal, the Jean Denton Memorial Fellowship and the Creswick Fellowship Award.

In 2009, Briggs received an honorary Doctor of Letters degree from the University of Sheffield for outstanding research, publications and contributions to education relating to child abuse and child protection.

Selected publications

Books
 
 
 
 
 
 
 
 
  PUB L 169.

Book chapters

Journal articles

References

1930 births
2016 deaths
Officers of the Order of Australia
Child welfare in Australia
Australian women academics
Australian of the Year Award winners
Recipients of the Centenary Medal
Academic staff of the University of South Australia
Alumni of the University of Warwick
20th-century Australian writers
20th-century Australian women writers
21st-century Australian writers
21st-century Australian women writers
English emigrants to Australia
Alumni of the University of Sheffield
Women Metropolitan Police officers
Children's rights activists
Metropolitan Police officers